is a former Japanese football player.

Playing career
Yatsuda was born in Okawa on March 17, 1982. After graduating from high school, he joined J1 League club Sanfrecce Hiroshima in 2000. However he could not play many matches until 2002 and the club was relegated to J2 League from 2003. In 2003, he played many matches as center back and the club was promoted to J1 from 2004. However he could hardly play in the match in 2004. In 2005, he moved to J2 club Sagan Tosu on loan. He played as regular center back until summer. However he could hardly play in the match from summer. In 2006, he returned to Sanfrecce Hiroshima. However he could hardly play in the match. In 2007, he moved to J1 club FC Tokyo. However he could hardly play in the match. In 2008, he moved to J2 club Yokohama FC. He played many matches as one of a regular player in 2 seasons. In 2010, he moved to J2 club Tokushima Vortis. However he could not play at all in the match. In 2011, he moved to Regional Leagues club SC Sagamihara and played many matches. In 2012, he moved to J2 club Avispa Fukuoka based in his local. However he could not play at all in the match and retired end of 2012 season.

Club statistics

References

External links

1982 births
Living people
Association football people from Fukuoka Prefecture
Japanese footballers
J1 League players
J2 League players
Sanfrecce Hiroshima players
Sagan Tosu players
FC Tokyo players
Yokohama FC players
Tokushima Vortis players
SC Sagamihara players
Avispa Fukuoka players
Association football defenders